

Tonga at the 1994 Commonwealth Games was abbreviated TGA.

Medals

Medalists

Gold
none

Silver
none

Bronze
Paea Wolfgramm — Boxing, Men's Super Heavyweight

References

1994
Commonwealth Games
Nations at the 1994 Commonwealth Games